The Orléanais dialect is a langue d'oïl that was part of a dialect group called Francien.

The dialect covers three departments, corresponding to the territory of Orléanais, former province of the kingdom of France: Loir-et-Cher, Loiret and Eure-et-Loir. It and other Francien dialects such as Berrichon progressively dissolved into a regional variant of French.

References

French dialects